Veronica Constance" Vee" Papworth (31 May 1913 – 21 September 1992), also known as Veronica Walley, was a British journalist and illustrator. She joined the London Evening Star in 1946 as a fashion illustrator and writer and moved to the women's pages of the Sunday Express in the 1950s where she stayed until the 1970s, both contributing a weekly column and illustrating her words.

She married surgeon George Jon Walley in 1950.

References

External links
Getty Images - Veronica Papworth
 Veronica Papworth website

1913 births
1992 deaths
People from the London Borough of Hackney
20th-century British journalists
British women journalists